A village in the U.S. state of Oregon is a model of local governance that  only exists in  Clackamas County.  Like villages elsewhere, it is a subnational entity; like New York's villages, the definition is unique to a state (at the moment, to one county in a state).

Villages in Oregon are in addition to hamlets in Oregon (which were defined at the same time as villages) and to Community Planning Organizations (CPOs), which predate both villages and hamlets.

In June 2006, citizens in the Mount Hood Corridor communities of Brightwood, Wemme, Welches, Zigzag, and Rhododendron voted to become the Villages at Mount Hood, Oregon's first village. From a census perspective these communities are part of the Mount Hood Village CDP.

The residents of Boring voted against forming a village in July 2006.
Government Camp, another community within the Mount Hood Corridor, is considering a village as a possible governance option.

Definition
For purposes of the laws related to hamlets and villages, a "citizen" means either 
a resident at least 18 years of age living within the boundaries of a hamlet or village, or
a non-resident who owns property or a business there.

According to Chapter 2.10 of the Clackamas County Code, a village is

A village's boundaries cannot overlap the boundaries of another hamlet, village or city.

Process
To establish a village, a chief petitioner is responsible to collect the required number of citizen signatures and complete a village application form within 120 days.  The petition
must be signed by at least 15% (vs. 10% for hamlets) of the citizens located within the proposed village boundary or 150 citizens (vs. 100), whichever is the lesser number, and shall state the proposed name, preliminary purpose, boundaries, number of Board members, and activities for the village.
A public hearing is then held, with a defined method of public notice beforehand.  The BCC can then approve the petition as is, approve it with modifications, or reject it.

If approved, within thirty days an organizational meeting must be held by the village's citizens.  The purpose of the meeting is to establish a list of candidates for the village's Board.  That list must also be approved by the BCC; once approved, the citizen's meet again, to vote on their board.

Once elected, the Board defines the village's bylaws, which must also be approved by its citizens and the BCC.  The Board also defines a village's plan, which defines the activities to be undertaken by the village, and which, like the bylaws, must be approved by its citizens and the BCC.

Unlike hamlets, villages have specific public alternatives available to them for financing improvements in services and facilities within the village.  Subject to state and county law, funding can be based on a tax, fees, local improvement district, or other service district.  New taxes require approval in an election that the BCC orders on the village's behalf.

The ordinance defining villages defines similar processes for other aspects of villages, such as their dissolution.  In particular, Board members acting within their authority as defined by bylaws and county policy are treated as agents of the county for claims made against the organization, officer or member for the purposes of the Oregon Tort Claims Act.

See also 
 Hamlets in Oregon

References

Sources

External links 
 Hamlets and villages and Three communities apply for special status from the Clackamas County website
Clackamas County Considering Hamlets and Villages, a September 2005 article from Oregon Public Broadcasting
  for the Villages at Mount Hood, the first village

Clackamas County, Oregon
Local government in Oregon
 
Unincorporated communities in Oregon